The slender burrowing grasshopper (Acrotylus patruelis) is a species of bandwing grasshopper found throughout Africa, southern Europe and southwestern Asia. It occurs in many dry open habitats with bare ground, such as savannah, grassland and Mediterranean shrubland.

References

Oedipodinae
Insects described in 1838